CJC-1295, also known as DAC:GRF (short for drug affinity complex:growth hormone-releasing factor), is a synthetic analogue of growth hormone-releasing hormone (GHRH) (also known as growth hormone-releasing factor (GRF)) and a growth hormone secretagogue (GHS) which was developed by ConjuChem Biotechnologies. It is a modified form of GHRH (1-29) with improved pharmacokinetics, especially in regard to half-life.

CJC-1295 markedly increases plasma growth hormone (GH) and insulin-like growth factor 1 (IGF-1) levels in both animals and humans. With a single injection, in human subjects, CJC-1295 increases plasma GH levels by 2- to 10-fold for 6 days or longer and plasma IGF-1 levels by 0.5- to 3-fold for 9 to 11 days. The drug has an estimated half-life of about 6 to 8 days in humans. With multiple doses of CJC-1295, IGF-1 levels were found to remain elevated in humans for up to 28 days.

CJC-1295 has been shown to extend the half-life and bioavailability of growth-hormone-releasing hormone 1-29 and stimulate insulin-like growth factor 1 secretion. It increases the half-life of acting agents by bioconjugation.

CJC-1295 was under investigation for the treatment of lipodystrophy and growth hormone deficiency and reached phase II clinical trials but was discontinued upon the death of one of the trial subjects. The attending physician of the trial believed that the most likely explanation for the incident was that the patient had asymptomatic coronary artery disease with plaque rupture and occlusion, and that the occurrence was unrelated to treatment with CJC-1295. Research was terminated nonetheless as a precaution. CJC-1295 has found grey market use for bodybuilding purposes, with this, in some countries such as the Netherlands, being an illicit use.

See also 
 List of growth hormone secretagogues

References

External links 
 CJC-1295 - AdisInsight

Abandoned drugs
Growth hormone-releasing hormone receptor agonists
Growth hormone secretagogues
Peptides
World Anti-Doping Agency prohibited substances